Krasny Uryush (Qıźıl Üreş) is a rural locality (a selo) in Uryush-Bittulinsky Selsoviet, Karaidelsky District, Bashkortostan, Russia. The population was 502 as of 2010. There are 21 streets.

Geography 
Krasny Uryush is located 46 km southwest of Karaidel (the district's administrative centre) by road. Tatarsky Uryush is the nearest rural locality.

References 

Rural localities in Karaidelsky District